Portugal competed at the World Games 2017 in Wroclaw, Poland, from July 20, 2017 to July 30, 2017.

Competitors

Gymnastic

Trampoline
Portugal has qualified at the 2017 World Games:

Men's Individual Double Mini Trampoline - 1 quota 
Men's Synchronized Trampoline - 1 quota
Women's Individual Double Mini Trampoline - 1 quota
Women's Synchronized Trampoline - 1 quota

References 

Nations at the 2017 World Games
2017 in Portuguese sport
2017